Kuramathi at  long is the largest of six islands that belong to the small natural atoll, located a few miles off NE Ari Atoll, known as Karaa, Thoddoo, or Thoddoo Atoll, which administratively belongs to Alif Alif Atoll.

Geography 
There is a sandbank on the west of the island which is only visible when the tide is low.

Ecology 

Since January 2000, Kuramathi has had a biological station where guests can obtain information about the local marine environment.

The following marine life can be encountered in Kuramathi: angelfish; butterflyfish; corals; hawkfish; manta rays; Moorish idols; moray eels; parrotfish; Portuguese man o' wars; rays; sea turtles; sharks; surgeonfish; sweetlips; triggerfish; unicornfish; Sunfish

External links 
Official resort site

Islands of the Maldives